Cecil Hilton (1884 – 19 June 1931) was a British Unionist Party politician.  He was a Member of Parliament (MP) for Bolton, a two-member constituency, from 1924 to 1929.

References 

Members of the Parliament of the United Kingdom for English constituencies
People from Bolton
UK MPs 1924–1929
1884 births
1931 deaths
Conservative Party (UK) MPs for English constituencies